Bradnop is a village in Staffordshire, England, located just a few miles to the southeast of the market town of Leek. The name Bradnop was first recorded in 1197, and gets its name from the Old English words "bradan", meaning broad, and "hop", meaning enclosed valley. Historically Bradnop was a township of the parish of Leek, and later became a civil parish in its own right, with an area 3,568 acres (1,444 hectares).

Transport
Also at Bradnop, lies the 36yd long Bradnop Tunnel also the branch and possibly the shortest on the line as well as the CVR itself.

See also
Listed buildings in Bradnop

References

External links

Villages in Staffordshire
Towns and villages of the Peak District